The only significant 28-bit computer was the Norsk Data ND-505, which was essentially a 32-bit machine with four wires in its address bus removed. The reason for scaling down was to be able to sell it to Eastern Bloc countries, avoiding the then CoCom embargo on 32-bit machines.

Norway–Soviet Union relations
Norsk Data minicomputers
Foreign trade of the Soviet Union